In propositional logic, modus tollens (MT), also known as modus tollendo tollens (Latin for "method of removing by taking away") and denying the consequent, is a deductive argument form and a rule of inference. Modus tollens takes the form of "If P, then Q. Not Q. Therefore, not P." It is an application of the general truth that if a statement is true, then so is its contrapositive. The form shows that inference from P implies Q to the negation of Q implies the negation of P is a valid argument.

The history of the inference rule modus tollens goes back to antiquity. The first to explicitly describe the argument form modus tollens was Theophrastus.

Modus tollens is closely related to modus ponens. There are two similar, but invalid, forms of argument: affirming the consequent and denying the antecedent.  See also contraposition and proof by contrapositive.

Explanation 
The form of a modus tollens argument resembles a syllogism, with two premises and a conclusion:

If P, then Q.
Not Q.
Therefore, not P.

The first premise is a conditional ("if-then") claim, such as P implies Q. The second premise is an assertion that Q, the consequent of the conditional claim, is not the case. From these two premises it can be logically concluded that P, the antecedent of the conditional claim, is also not the case.

For example:

If the dog detects an intruder, the dog will bark.
The dog did not bark.
Therefore, no intruder was detected by the dog.

Supposing that the premises are both true (the dog will bark if it detects an intruder, and does indeed not bark), it follows that no intruder has been detected. This is a valid argument since it is not possible for the conclusion to be false if the premises are true. (It is conceivable that there may have been an intruder that the dog did not detect, but that does not invalidate the argument; the first premise is "if the dog detects an intruder". The thing of importance is that the dog detects or does not detect an intruder, not whether there is one.)

Another example:
If I am the axe murderer, then I can use an axe.
I cannot use an axe.
Therefore, I am not the axe murderer.

Another example: 
If Rex is a chicken, then he is a bird.
Rex is not a bird.
Therefore, Rex is not a chicken.

Relation to modus ponens 
Every use of modus tollens can be converted to a use of modus ponens and one use of transposition to the premise which is a material implication. For example:

If P, then Q. (premise – material implication)
If not Q, then not P. (derived by transposition)
Not Q . (premise)
Therefore, not P. (derived by modus ponens)

Likewise, every use of modus ponens can be converted to a use of modus tollens and transposition.

Formal notation 
The modus tollens rule can be stated formally as:

where  stands for the statement "P implies Q".  stands for "it is not the case that Q" (or in brief "not Q"). Then, whenever "" and "" each appear by themselves as a line of a proof, then "" can validly be placed on a subsequent line.

The modus tollens rule may be written in sequent notation:

or as the statement of a functional tautology or theorem of propositional logic:

or including assumptions:

though since the rule does not change the set of assumptions, this is not strictly necessary.

More complex rewritings involving modus tollens are often seen, for instance in set theory:

("P is a subset of Q. x is not in Q. Therefore, x is not in P.")

Also in first-order predicate logic:

("For all x if x is P then x is Q. y is not Q. Therefore, y is not P.")

Strictly speaking these are not instances of modus tollens, but they may be derived from modus tollens using a few extra steps.

Justification via truth table 
The validity of modus tollens can be clearly demonstrated through a truth table.

In instances of modus tollens we assume as premises that p → q is true and q is false. There is only one line of the truth table—the fourth line—which satisfies these two conditions. In this line, p is false. Therefore, in every instance in which p → q is true and q is false, p must also be false.

Formal proof

Via disjunctive syllogism

Via reductio ad absurdum

Via contraposition

Correspondence to other mathematical frameworks

Probability calculus
Modus tollens represents an instance of the law of total probability combined with Bayes' theorem expressed as:

,

The conditional probability  generalizes the logical statement , i.e. in addition to assigning TRUE or FALSE we can also assign any probability to the statement. Assume that  is equivalent to  being TRUE, and that  is equivalent to  being FALSE. This is because  so that  in the last equation. Therefore, the product terms in the first equation always have a zero factor so that  which is equivalent to  being FALSE. Hence, the law of total probability combined with Bayes' theorem represents a generalization of modus tollens.

Subjective logic
Modus tollens represents an instance of the abduction operator in subjective logic expressed as:

,

The conditional opinion  generalizes the logical statement , i.e. in addition to assigning TRUE or FALSE the source  can assign any subjective opinion to the statement. The case where  is an absolute TRUE opinion is equivalent to source  saying that  is TRUE, and the case where  is an absolute FALSE opinion is equivalent to source  saying that  is FALSE. The abduction operator  of subjective logic produces an absolute FALSE abduced opinion  when the conditional opinion  is absolute TRUE and the consequent opinion  is absolute FALSE. Hence, subjective logic abduction represents a generalization of both modus tollens and of the Law of total probability combined with Bayes' theorem.

See also

Notes

Sources 
 Audun Jøsang, 2016, Subjective Logic; A formalism for Reasoning Under Uncertainty Springer, Cham,

External links 
 Modus Tollens at Wolfram MathWorld

Classical logic
Rules of inference
Latin logical phrases
Theorems in propositional logic